Fornells is a village located in a bay in the north of the Balearic island of Menorca, Spain. Fornells is estimated to have a population of about 1000 people which increases in the summer due to tourism. Fornells' native people are known as Fornellers in  the Catalan language and in Spanish.

History 

The village was founded to serve a small defensive watch tower, built at the beginning of the 17th century as a defence against the Barbary pirates for whom Fornells Bay provided the perfect safe haven. This watch tower proved to be insufficient, so in 1625 King Phillip IV of Spain ordered a castle to be added. This project was not successful due to lack of funds. In 1637 the building project was recommenced as the castle of Sant Antoni. During construction, a small village was formed around the castle, occupied by construction workers and soldiers, this village becoming the basis of modern-day Fornells. During the 18th century the castle was held alternately by the British and French, before returning to Spanish dominion in 1782. King Charles III of Spain then ordered the partial destruction of the castle and all that is left of the military past of Fornells is the watch tower on the headland, outside the village. From there to the west Cavallería Cape can be seen, and to the east the massive bulk of Sa Mola, forming the eastern side of the entrance.

In 1798 the village was a landing site during the Capture of Menorca by the British.

Location 

Fornells Bay is deep, measuring 5 kilometres long and 2 kilometres wide. The narrow entrance regulates the force of the open sea. Sufficiently narrow to offer protection, the entrance allows water to enter the bay while restricting the waves. The wind is not so easily restrained. The surrounding hills are not high enough to keep out the Tramontane (Tramontana in Catalan), which has shaped the rocks and bent the trees over until the branches almost touch the ground.

Fishing village 

Fornells' natural harbour is filled with llauts, the traditional Menorcan fishing craft, used for fishing lobsters.

Tourist Activities 
Having several small beaches around the bay, the harbour offers a number of aquatic activities for tourists, including boat trips, catamaran excursions, kayaking windsurfing and catamaran tour menorca

The annual fiesta de Sant Antoni is held on the fourth weekend in July.

References

External links 
Virtual tour through Fornells
Fornells' bay webcam

Geography of Menorca